Great New Orleans Fire may refer to:

 Great New Orleans Fire (1788)
 Great New Orleans Fire (1794)